The Carlow county hurling team represents Carlow in hurling and is governed by Carlow GAA, the county board of the Gaelic Athletic Association. The team competes in the Joe McDonagh Cup and the National Hurling League.

Carlow's home ground is Dr Cullen Park, Carlow. The team's manager is Tom Mullally.

The team has never won the Leinster Senior Championship, the All-Ireland Senior Championship or the National League.

History
Carlow have won three Christy Ring Championships. After losing the 2006 final to Antrim at Croke Park, they beat Westmeath in a classic final (after extra time) by 3–22 to 4–16 in 2008. This was their first "Division 2" win since 1992 and their first in the re-arranged All-Ireland structure which saw four divisions in hurling from 2009.

They repeated the feat the following year, defeating Down at Croke Park to win a two in a row and earn automatic promotion to tier one for 2010. They played at this level until 2016 which saw them relegated from the Leinster Senior Hurling Championship. The very next year, however, they won the 2017 Christy Ring Cup for a record equalling third time, gaining promotion to the top tier of hurling once again.

Carlow's last appearance in a Leinster Senior Hurling Championship semi-final was in 1993, when Kilkenny defeated them by 18 points.

Colm Bonnar left as manager in November 2020. Tom Mullally succeeded him, from January 2021.

Current panel

Current management team
Management team confirmed on 3 February 2021:
Manager: Tom Mullally (appointed 21 January 2021)
Selectors: Chris Kealy, Joe Nolan, Pat Murphy
Coaches: John Dermody, Paddy Mullally
Liaison officer: Michael Whelan (continuing)

Players

Notable players

Records
 Edward Coady (Mount Leinster Rangers) – Christy Ring Cup SH winner 2008, 2009 Christy Ring All Star winner, Leinster Hurling Club winner Intermediate, Carlow Hurler of the Year winner 2006, winner of first All-Ireland Club Hurling title in Carlow 2012. Leinster Senior Hurling Club Championship winner 2013 first Carlow club or team to win a Leinster Championship at Senior 2013. 
 James Hickey (Mount Leinster Rangers) – Christy Ring Cup winner SH 2008, 2009 Christy Ring All Star winner, Leinster Hurling Club winner Intermediate, Carlow Hurler of the Year winner 2009 winner of first All-Ireland Club Hurling title in Carlow 2012. Leinster Senior Hurling Club Championship winner 2013 first Carlow club or team to Win a Leinster Championship at Senior 2013. 
 Johnny Nevin (Old Leighlin GFC/Naomh Brid HC) - Railway Cup SF, SH, All-Ireland Senior B Football Championship 1994, Carlow Championship 1997, All-Ireland over-40s runner-up 2008
 Rory Dunbar (Carlow Town) – Christy Ring Cup winner 2009 2008 and Minor 2002.
 Des Murphy (Naomh Eoin, Myshall) – Christy Ring Cup SH 2008, all-time most SH appearances.
 Jim English (Erin's Own, Bagenalstown) – All-Ireland SHC 1947 (with Wexford), Railway Cup SH.
 Mark Mullins (Erin's Own, Bagenalstown) – All-Ireland Senior B Hurling Championship 1992, Cork SH captain 1995.
 Jim Treacy (St Mullins) – All-Ireland IHC 1961.
 Jamie McGrath (St Mullins) – County Championship 2001. Scored four goals to win game. 
 Niall English (O'Hanrahan's GFC/Carlow Town HC) – All-Ireland Senior B Hurling Championship 1992.
 Shane Kavanagh (Naomh Eoin, Myshall) – Christy Ring Cup 2008, Railway Cup SH.
 Stephen Sheil (Kildavin/Clonegal) – Intermediate Hurling of the Year 1997 – played with the county from the age of 13 (1996 until 2004) He was rated one of the top defenders in the county and in all of Leinster. He won titles not only for County Carlow but also for County Wexford. He is the youngest of three boys, with Thomas and Derek also togging out in the county colours. Stephen's father Stephen Snr also played for Carlow in both hurling and football.

Top scorers

Martin Kavanagh

Honours

National
All-Ireland Senior B Hurling Championship
 Winners (1): 1992
 Runners-up (1): 1987
Joe McDonagh Cup
 Winners (1): 2018
 All-Ireland Intermediate Hurling Championship
 Winners (1): 1962
Christy Ring Cup
 Winners (3): 2008, 2009, 2017
National Hurling League Division 2A
 Winners (2): 2012, 2018
All-Ireland Under-21 B Championship
 Winners (1): 2008
All Ireland Minor B Hurling Championship
 Winners (5): 1998, 2002, 2003, 2004, 2005

Provincial
Leinster Intermediate Hurling Championship
 Winners (1): 1962
Leinster Junior Hurling Championship
 Winners (2): 1906, 1970
Leinster Minor B Hurling Championship
 Winners (1): 1998
Kehoe Cup Championship
 Winners (6): 1986, 1990, 1992, 1999, 2005, 2006

References

 
County hurling teams